The Civil Aviation Institute of Cuba (IACC) is the civil aviation authority of Cuba, headquartered in Vedado, Plaza de la Revolución, Havana.

The IACC was created as a result of Decree Law 85 of June 12, 1985. , Ramón Martínez Echevarría is the president of the IACC.

See also

 Aero Caribbean Flight 883
Cubana de Aviación Flight 972

References

External links
 Civil Aviation Institute of Cuba 
Civil Aviation Institute of Cuba  (Archive)

Organizations investigating aviation accidents and incidents
Government agencies of Cuba
Cuba
Aviation organizations based in Cuba